Nasa is a genus of plants in the family Loasaceae containing over 100 known species, all of which are found in South America with the exception of two species endemic to Central America. They are common in submontane to montane environments. 

Species include:
 Nasa aequatoriana
 Nasa amaluzensis
 Nasa asplundii
 Nasa auca
 Nasa connectans
 Nasa ferox
 Nasa grandiflora
 Nasa glabra
 Nasa hornii
 Nasa humboldtiana
 Nasa jungifolia
 Nasa loxensis
 Nasa modesta
 Nasa panamensis
 Nasa peltata
 Nasa profundilobata
 Nasa rufipila
 Nasa speciosa
 Nasa tabularis

 
Cornales genera